Ross Brann is an American religion historian, currently the Milton R. Konvitz Professor of Judeo-Islamic Studies at Cornell University.

Published works 

 The Compunctious Poet: Cultural Ambiguity and Hebrew Poetry in Muslim Spain (Johns Hopkins University Press, 1991)

Awards 

 1992: National Jewish Book Award in the Sephardic Studies category for The Compunctious Poet: Cultural Ambiguity and Hebrew Poetry in Muslim Spain

Further reading 

 "Review: The Compunctious Hebrew Poet" (Indiana University Press, May 1992)

References

Year of birth missing (living people)
Living people
Cornell University faculty
21st-century American historians
21st-century American male writers
American male non-fiction writers